Mostafa El Badry (born May 21, 1997) is an Egyptian footballer who plays for Egyptian club Future on loan from Al Ahly. He was born in Aswan.

References

1997 births
Egyptian footballers
Living people
People from Aswan
Al Ahly SC players
El Entag El Harby SC players
Egyptian Premier League players
Association football midfielders
Future FC (Egypt) players